Pavel Yuryevich Uvarov (born January 4, 1956, in Moscow) is a Russian historian, Doctor of Sciences in Historical Sciences (2003), professor (2006), Head of Department of Western Middle Ages and Early Modern Times, Institute of World History, Russian Academy of Sciences. Correspondent Member of the Russian Academy of Sciences since 2006.
Professor of National Research University Higher School of Economics (Moscow).

He graduated from the Moscow State Pedagogical University in 1978.
He taught at the Moscow State Pedagogical University.

Since 2010, he has been working at the Higher School of Economics, where he is currently a Head of the Department of social history.

References

Living people
1956 births
Russian medievalists
Russian historiographers
Historians of France
Corresponding Members of the Russian Academy of Sciences
Academic staff of the Higher School of Economics